SSGC may refer to:

 St. Stephen's Girls' College
 Sui Southern Gas Company
 Friedman%27s SSCG function